Vaire-Arcier is a former commune in the Doubs department in the Franche-Comté region in eastern France. The communes of Vaire-le-Grand and Arcier were merged on 1 March 1974 to become Vaire-Arcier. On 1 June 2016, it was merged into the new commune of Vaire.

Population

See also
 Château de Vaire-Le-Grand, located in Vaire-Arcier
 Vaire-le-Petit, located on the north bank of the Doubs

References

Former communes of Doubs